Edmund Sheffield, 1st Baron Sheffield, of Butterwick (22 November 1521 – 19 July 1549) was an English nobleman, the son of Sir Robert Sheffield (died 15 November 1531, son of Robert Sheffield and Helen Delves) and his second wife Jane Stanley, daughter of George Stanley, 9th Baron Strange and Joan le Strange, 9th Baroness Strange. Through his mother, he was a second cousin once removed of the reigning English monarch, King Henry VIII.

Life
Following his father's death in 1531, his wardship was granted to George Boleyn, Viscount Rochford, the brother of Henry VIII's second wife, Anne Boleyn. However, both Rochford and Boleyn were executed in 1536, and his wardship was transferred to John de Vere, the fifteenth Earl of Oxford.

Sheffield married Anne de Vere, daughter of John de Vere, 15th Earl of Oxford, before 31 January 1538, and by her had a son and three daughters. In 1547 he was raised to the Peerage of England as Baron Sheffield of Butterwick. Two years later, during Kett's Rebellion in Norwich, Lord Sheffield was killed in a street near the Cathedral Close when he fell from his horse, removed his helmet assuming the customary capture and eventual ransom, yet was fatally struck by a butcher.

He was buried at St Martin at Palace, Norwich.

Children
Eleanor Sheffield (born about 1537) married Denzel Holles
John Sheffield, 2nd Baron Sheffield (c. 1538 – 10 December 1568) married Douglas Howard
Robert Sheffield (born about 1540)
Frances Sheffield (born 1542) married Thomas Metham
Elizabeth Sheffield (born about 1546)

Ancestry

References

Edmund Sheffield Accessed February 17, 2008
familysearch.org Accessed February 17, 2008

1521 births
1549 deaths
Barons Sheffield
Peers of England created by Edward VI
16th-century English nobility
Edmund
English murder victims
People from the Borough of Boston